Simon Oven (born 14 February 1993) is a Slovenian male canoeist who won four medals at senior level at the Wildwater Canoeing World Championships.

Oven won two editions of the Wildwater Canoeing World Cup in K1.

Medals at the World Championships
Senior

References

External links
 

1993 births
Living people
Slovenian male canoeists
Place of birth missing (living people)